Qeshlaq-e Luleh Darreh may refer to:
 Qeshlaq-e Luleh Darreh Hajji Hasan
 Qeshlaq-e Luleh Darreh Jamshid